The Order of the Red Star was a military decoration of the Soviet Union.  It was established by decree of the Presidium of the Supreme Soviet of the USSR of 6 April 1930 but its statute was only defined in decree of the Presidium of the Supreme Soviet of the USSR of 5 May 1930. That statute was amended by decrees of the Presidium of the Supreme Soviet of the USSR of 7 May 1936, of 19 June 1943, of 26 February 1946, of 15 October 1947, of 16 December 1947 and by decree No 1803-X of 28 March 1980.

Award statute 
The Order of the Red Star was awarded to soldiers of the Soviet Army, Navy, border and internal security forces, employees of the State Security Committee of the USSR, as well as NCOs and officers of the bodies of internal affairs; to units, warships, associations, enterprises, institutions and organizations; as well as to military personnel of foreign countries:
for personal courage and bravery in battle, for the excellent organization and leadership in combat that contributed to the success of our troops;
for successful operations of military units and formations which resulted in the enemy suffering considerable casualties or damage;
for outstanding service in ensuring public safety and the security of the State Border of the USSR;
for courage and valour displayed during the performance of military duties, or, in circumstances involving a risk to life;
for exemplary performance of special command tasks and other outstanding deeds committed in peacetime;
for great contribution in maintaining the high combat readiness of troops, excellent performance in combat and political training, in the mastery of new combat equipment and other services associated with strengthening the defensive might of the USSR;
for merit in the development of military science and technologies used in training of the Armed Forces of the USSR;
for merit in strengthening the defence capabilities of the socialist community.

The Order of the Red Star is worn on the right side of the chest and when in the presence of other orders of the USSR, placed immediately after the Order of the Patriotic War 2nd class. If worn in the presence of Orders or medals of the Russian Federation, the latter have precedence.

Long service award 
The Order of the Red Star was also used as a long service award from 1944 to 1958 to mark fifteen years of service in the military, state security, or police.  Decree of the Presidium of the Supreme Soviet of the USSR of 14 September 1957 emphasised the devaluation of certain Soviet high military Orders used as long service awards instead of their originally intended criteria.  This led to the joint 25 January 1958 decree of the Ministers of Defence, of Internal Affairs and of the Chairman of the Committee on State Security of the USSR establishing the Medal "For Impeccable Service" putting an end to the practice.

Award description 
The Order of the Red Star is a red enamelled 47mm to 50mm wide (depending on the variant) silver five pointed star.  In the center of the obverse, an oxydised silver shield bearing the image of an erect soldier wearing an overcoat and carrying a rifle, along the shield's entire circumference, a narrow band bearing the Communist motto in relief, "Workers of the world, unite!", the band below the soldier bore the relief inscription "USSR".  Below the shield, the hammer and sickle also of oxydised silver.  The otherwise plain reverse bore the maker's mark and the award serial number.  The Order was attached to clothing by a threaded stud and screw attachment.

When the order wasn't worn, a ribbon could be worn in its stead on the ribbon bar on the left side of the chest.  The ribbon of the Order of the red Star was a 24mm wide silk moiré dark red with a 5mm wide central silver stripe.

Noteworthy recipients (partial list) 
The Order of the Red Star was awarded 6 times to 5 people, 5 times to more than 15 people, four times to more than 150 people, three times to more than 1,000 people. Below is a short partial list of such multiple recipients:

Six times
 Colonel Philip Petrovich Onoprienko
 Colonel Peter Petrovich Panchenko
 Lieutenant Colonel Vasily Vasilevich Silantyev

Five times
 Colonel Konstantin Ivanovich Malkhasyan
 Major General Ivan Nikiforovich Stepanenko
 Colonel Alexey Petrovich Yakimov

Four times
 Lieutenant General Galaktion Alpaidze
 Colonel General Georgy Baydukov
 Colonel General Alexander Ivanovich Babaev
 Colonel Valentin Gavrilov
 General Gaysin, V.B.

Three times

 Captain Zelig Fisher
 Lieutenant Colonel Naum Shusterman
 Lieutenant Colonel Anatoly Lebed
 Lieutenant Colonel Korolev Alexey Denisovich
 Army General Alexei Yepishev
 Army General Gennady Ivanovich Obaturov
 Captain (navy) Asaf Abdrakhmanov
 Lieutenant General Alexander Vasilyevich Belyakov
 Rear Admiral Aksel Berg
 Admiral Nikolai Sergeyev
 Aviator Olga Yamshchikova
 Major Marina Chechneva
 Major Samuil Kovner
 Major General Лукашев, Василий Васильевич

Twice
 Marshal of the Soviet Union Sergey Akhromeyev
 Marshal of the Soviet Union Nikolai Bulganin
 Major General Georgy Beregovoy
 Colonel General Igor Rodionov
 Sergey Ilyushin
 Semyon Nomokonov
 Colonel Ivan Kozhedub
 Colonel Dmitry Loza
 Marshal of Aviation Alexander Pokryshkin
 Marshal of the Soviet Union Boris Shaposhnikov
 Senior Sergeant Yakov Pavlov
 Admiral Arseniy Golovko
 Rear Admiral Vladimir Konovalov
 Admiral Gordey Levchenko
 Admiral Ivan Stepanovich Yumashev
 Army General Ivan Yefimovich Petrov

Singles
 
 Admiral Nikolay Gerasimovich Kuznetsov
 Astronaut Vladimir Komarov
 Ivan Gevorkian, famous Soviet Armenian surgeon and scientist.
 Pavel Sukhoi
 Natalya Kovshova, Red Army sniper. First Woman to receive the Red Star.
 Andrei Tupolev
 Astronaut Andriyan Nikolayev
 Astronaut Pavel Popovich
 Philosopher Grigori Pomerants
 Major General Valery Bykovsky
 Major Pavel Belyayev
 Major General Alexei Leonov
 Senior Lieutenant Simon Alexandrovich Marcus
 Mikhail Mil
 Heydar Aliyev
 Evdokia Zavaliy
 Astronaut Vladimir Dzhanibekov
 Pilot Khiuaz Dospanova
 Major Yakov Drob 
 Lieutenant General Alexander Lebed
 Vasily Degtyaryov
 Marshal of the Soviet Union Vasily Chuikov
 Manhattan Project spy Harry Gold (secret)
 World War II Soviet spy Elizabeth Bentley (secret)
 Cold War Nuclear Submariner, Seaman Sergei Preminin
 Guards Sergeant Mariya Borovichenko
 Vice Admiral Vasily Arkhipov
 Tamara Pamyatnykh, female fighter pilot
 Aleksandr Solzhenitsyn commander of a sound-ranging battery in the Red Army and Nobel laureate for literature.

Mikhail Konstantinovich Kudryavtsev
 Colonel Nikolai Petrov, Deputy head of Moscow Anti-Aircraft Defences
 Olga Avilova, surgeon
 Ilya Devin, writer
 Lieutenant Mikhail Golobokov
 Victor Stern

Units 
 Alexandrov Ensemble
 89th Rifle Division
 9th Infantry Division
 80th Airmobile Regiment
 8th Army Corps
 7th Guards Airborne Division
 10th Guards Motor Rifle Division

In 2015 the Order of the Red Star award awarded to Ukrainian army units were removed as part of a removal of Soviet awards and decorations from Ukrainian military units.

References

External links
  Legal Library of the USSR
 Soviet-Awards.com  A non-commercial website
  Russian language, non-commercial website

Awards established in 1930
Awards disestablished in 1991
1991 disestablishments in the Soviet Union
Red star
Long service medals